Kõue Parish was a rural municipality in Harju County, Estonia.

In October 2013, Kõue Parish was merged with neighbouring Kose Parish and therefore ceased to exist.

On 1 January 2009, the municipality had a population of 1,685 and covered an area of 295.5 km2. The current mayor is Ott Valdma.

Administrative centre of the municipality was Ardu small borough (alevik), located 57 km from Tallinn on the Tallinn–Tartu highway. Besides Ardu there was also Habaja small borough and 36 villages in Kõue Parish: Aela, Äksi, Alansi, Harmi, Kadja, Kantküla, Katsina, Kirivalla, Kiruvere, Kõrvenurga, Kõue, Kukepala, Laane, Leistu, Lööra, Lutsu, Marguse, Nõmmeri, Nutu, Ojasoo, Pala, Paunaste, Paunküla, Puusepa, Rava, Riidamäe, Rõõsa, Saarnakõrve, Sääsküla, Sae, Silmsi, Triigi, Uueveski, Vahetüki, Vanamõisa, Virla.

References

External links
 

Former municipalities of Estonia
Geography of Harju County
Kose Parish